Alwayno Visagie (born ) is a South African rugby union player for the  in the Currie Cup and the Rugby Challenge. His regular position is centre.

References

South African rugby union players
Living people
1996 births
People from Ceres, Western Cape
Rugby union centres
Sharks (Currie Cup) players
Pumas (Currie Cup) players
Rugby union players from the Western Cape